The 1992–93 season was the 94th completed season of the Football League.

This season saw the birth of the Premier League. In 1992, all of the First Division clubs resigned from the Football League and, on 27 May 1992, the FA Premier League was formed as a limited company, which worked out of an office at the Football Association’s then headquarters, Lancaster Gate. Hence, the 104-year-old Football League was reduced from four divisions to three, with the old Second, Third and Fourth Divisions becoming the new First, Second and Third Divisions respectively.

The league was sponsored this season by Barclays.

Final league tables and results 

The tables and results below are reproduced here in the exact form that they can be found at The Rec.Sport.Soccer Statistics Foundation website, with home and away statistics separated. Play-off results are from the same website.

First Division 

Newcastle United, who won their first 10 league games, clinched the Division One title with an impressive 96 points to end a four-year exile from the top flight of English football. West Ham United sealed an instant return to the top flight a year after relegation, edging ahead of Portsmouth on goal difference to finished second. Portsmouth's promotion bid, dominated by the form of 42-goal striker Guy Whittingham, ended in the playoff semi-finals when they were beaten by Leicester City, who went on to lose the final 4-3 to Swindon Town after clawing back from 3-0 down before a late penalty from Paul Bodin saw Swindon clinch victory and a place in the top flight for the first time ever. The other losing semi-finalists in the playoffs were Tranmere Rovers, playing only their second season at this level in the postwar era.

Millwall finished one place outside the playoff zone in the first season in management for Mick McCarthy, while pre-season promotion favourites Derby County could only manage an eighth-place finish despite having spent millions on new players over the previous two years. Unfancied Grimsby Town and Peterborough United finished in the top half of the table, comfortably above bigger clubs like Wolverhampton Wanderers and Birmingham City.

Luton Town and Notts County, newly relegated from the top flight, spent the season battling at the wrong end of the division but managed to avoid a second successive relegation, as did a Sunderland side who had been FA Cup finalists one season earlier and members of the top flight two seasons earlier.

Bristol Rovers went down in bottom place after a dismal season. Cambridge United, playoff semi-finalists the previous season, struggled after the sale of Dion Dublin and went down on the last day of the season, as did a Brentford side who had been on the fringe of the playoff places at Christmas before a slump in form during the second half of the season cost the Bees their Division One status and manager Phil Holder his job.

Results

Play-offs

Maps

Second Division 

Stoke City sealed promotion as Division Two champions in Lou Macari's second season as manager, having topped the table for most of the season, as did Bolton Wanderers under their new manager Bruce Rioch. The third promotion place went to playoff winners West Bromwich Albion, who beat Port Vale 3-0 in the Wembley promotion decider to secure their first promotion for 17 years and end their two-year spell in the league's third tier, as well as recording a first Wembley victory for 25 years.

Swansea City and Stockport County were the losing semi-finalists.

Leyton Orient missed out on the playoff places as they had scored fewer goals than Stockport. Managing director and former manager Frank Clark then left the club after accepting the offer to return to Nottingham Forest as manager as successor to Brian Clough.

Chester City's first season at the new Deva Stadium saw them relegated in bottom place and also spelled the end of Harry McNally's seven-year reign as manager in October, with his successor Mike Pejic being unable to steer the club to safety. Wigan Athletic finished second from bottom and suffered their first relegation as a Football League side. Mansfield Town finished third from bottom and suffered an immediate return to the league's fourth tier. The final relegation place went to Preston North End, who had replaced Les Chapman with John Beck as manager in October, but not even the man who was fresh from a successful spell in charge of Cambridge United could save the Lancashire side from relegation. Hull City narrowly avoided a second relegation in three seasons, while once again England World Cup winner Alan Ball was able to guide Exeter City to safety.

Results

Play-offs

Maps

Third Division 

The season began with the demise of Maidstone United, who had only reached the Football League three years earlier and were hundreds of thousands of pounds in debt, having been tenants at Dartford since 1988 and having been refused planning permission to build a new stadium on land in Maidstone which had since been purchased. A move to relocate the club to the North-East and merge the with non-league Newcastle Blue Star was vetoed by the Football League, and as the season dawned the club had just two players still registered. Their first league game of the new Division Three season was cancelled and they were given until the following Monday to guarantee that they would be able to fulfill their fixtures. Unable to come up with the necessary backing, they resigned from the league and went into liquidation on 17 August. 

As the Division Three campaign got underway, the two Welsh based sides in the division emerged as the pace-setters, with Cardiff City finishing as champions and Wrexham as runners-up. Barnet, who had spent much of the season under threat of going the same way as Maidstone due to mounting debts, being banned from the transfer market for failing to pay staff wages, and being threatened with expulsion from the Football League over an unapid fine, clinched the final automatic promotion place in only their second season in the Football League. The season also brought the end of Stan Flashman's eight-year ownership of the club, when he resigned as chairman of the club he had paid £50,000 to save from receivership in 1985. Just before promotion was clinched, manager Barry Fry left to take charge of Southend United, with his assistant Edwin Stein overseeing the final few games of the season before goalkeeper Gary Phillips took over as player-manager for the 1993-94 season.

Halifax Town, after 72 years of league membership, finished bottom of the league and were replaced by Conference champions Wycombe Wanderers. Maidstone United went out of business on 17 August after their first game was postponed, and were not replaced.

Results

Play-offs

Maps

See also
1992–93 in English football

References

 
English Football League seasons
2